Gianni Francesco Mattioli (born 29 January 1940 in Genoa) is an Italian politician and university professor.

Biography
Graduated in physics in 1964 with a thesis on the diffusion of high energy particles, in 1973 he became a professor of the same subject at La Sapienza University of Rome, conducting research in the field of quantum mechanics and rational mechanics.

In 1978 he founded the "Committee for the Control of Energy Choices", together with Massimo Scalia. He began his anti-nuclear commitment in the International Fellowship of Reconciliation in Rome. In 1981 he founded the magazine Quale energia?, of which he was director for six years.

In 1987 he was elected deputy among the ranks of the Greens, of which he was also president from 1988 to 1992. He was re-elected deputy also in 1992, 1994 and 1996. In 1996 he was appointed undersecretary of public works in the first Prodi government and in those years he joined the executive committee of Legambiente. From 2000 to 2001 he also served as Minister of Community Policies in the Amato II Cabinet, after his party colleague, Edo Ronchi, refused this post.

On 20 December 2009 he joined the national coordination of Left Ecology Freedom, of which he later became responsible for environmental policies.

Honours and awards 
 : Knight Grand Cross of the Order of Merit of the Italian Republic (2001)

External links 
 personal page on the site of Legambiente

References

1940 births
Living people
Federation of the Greens politicians
Democratic Alliance (Italy) politicians
Left Ecology Freedom politicians
Deputies of Legislature X of Italy
Deputies of Legislature XI of Italy
Deputies of Legislature XII of Italy
Deputies of Legislature XIII of Italy
Politicians from Genoa
Academic staff of the Sapienza University of Rome